Ahmed Moustafa Nasr El-Ahmar (also known as Ahmed Elahmar, ; born 27 January 1984) is an Egyptian handball player for Khaleej and the Egyptian national team.

Club career

Zamalek
El-Ahmar started his career with Zamalek in 2004 and remained until 2012.

El Jaish
Ahmed El-Ahmar joined El Jaish in 2012 and departed in 2015.

SG Flensburg-Handewitt
El-Ahmar joined SG Flensburg-Handewitt in February 2015 and departed in June 2015. He won the German Cup with the team in Hamburg on 10 May 2015.

Return to El-Zamalek
On 4 July 2015, it was officially announced that he signed a 2-year contract with El-Zamalek for the 2015–2017 season.

Honours

Club

National titles

Zamalek

 Egyptian Handball League: 8
 Champions: 2004–05, 2008–09, 2009–10, 2015–16, 2018–19, 2019–20, 2020–21 , 2021–22.
 Egyptian Handball Cup: 5 
 Champions: 2002, 2004, 2006, 2008, 2016.
 Egyptian Handball Super Cup: 3
 Champions: 2005–06, 2006–07, 2007–08.

El Jaish
 Qatar Handball League: 1
 Champions : 2013–14
 Qatar Handball Cup: 2
 Champions : 2013  , 2014

SG Flensburg-Handewitt
 DHB-Pokal:: 1
 : 2015

International titles

Zamalek
 African Handball Champions League: 5 
 Champions: 2011, 2015 , 2017, 2018, 2019
 Runners-up: 2012

 African Handball Cup Winners' Cup: 4
 Champions: 2009, 2010, 2011, 2016
 Runners-up: 2012

 African Handball Super Cup: 6
 Champions: 2010, 2011, 2012, 2018, 2019, 2021
 Runners-up: 2016, 2017

Club Africain
 African Handball Champions League: 1 
 Champions: 2014

El Jaish

 Asian Club League Handball Championship: 2 
 Champions: 2013, 2014

Al Ahli Saudi FC

 Asian Club League Handball Championship: 1 
 Champions: 2008

As-Sadd SC

 Asian Club League Handball Championship: 1 
 Champions: 2010

National team

 African Men's Handball Championship: 5 
 Champions: 2004, 2008, 2016, 2020, 2022
 Runners-up: 2006, 2010, 2018

 All-Africa Games: 1 
 2007 – 

 Pan Arab Games: 2 
 2007 – 
 2011 – 

 Mediterranean Games: 1 
 2013 –

Individual titles
5th All_time top scorer  World Men's Handball Championship with 283 goals African nations Egypt 2004: The best back right in Africa.African nations Angola 2008: The best back right, best player, best scorer and man of the match (4 times).African nations Egypt 2010: The best back right, best player and best scorer.El-Ahram International 2007: The best player.El-Ahram International 2009: The best player.Arab Championship in Saudi Arabia 2011: The best player. Club World Cup 2010 (Super Globe): Top scorer. Club World Cup 2011 (Super Globe): Top scorer.World Cup Man of the Match: 2007 Egypt against Spain. 2009 Egypt against Tunisia. 2011 Egypt against Tunisia. 2013 Egypt against Algeria. 2013 Egypt against Slovenia. 2015 – Egypt against Sweden. 2015 – Egypt against Algeria.African nations championship 2016: the best scorer the most valuable player '''the best back right

See also
List of handballers with 1000 or more international goals

References

External links
 
 
 
 

1984 births
Living people
Egyptian male handball players
Handball players at the 2008 Summer Olympics
Handball players at the 2016 Summer Olympics
Handball players at the 2020 Summer Olympics
Olympic handball players of Egypt
Expatriate handball players
Egyptian expatriate sportspeople in Germany
Egyptian expatriate sportspeople in Qatar
Handball-Bundesliga players
SG Flensburg-Handewitt players
Sportspeople from Giza
Competitors at the 2013 Mediterranean Games
Competitors at the 2022 Mediterranean Games
Mediterranean Games gold medalists for Egypt
Mediterranean Games silver medalists for Egypt
Mediterranean Games medalists in handball
21st-century Egyptian people